Umm Jabab is a village in central Syria, administratively part of the Homs Governorate, south of Homs. Nearby localities include al-Mukharram to the north and Jubb al-Jarrah to the northeast. According to the Central Bureau of Statistics, Umm Jabab had a population of 1,209 in the 2004 census.

References

Populated places in al-Mukharram District